Robina Higgins-Haight (28 April 1915 – 31 December 1990) was one of Canada's best female athletes in the 1930s.

From Winnipeg, Manitoba, Higgins excelled in the javelin, shot put, and ball throw competition. This mark stood until 1952.

During her brief career, Higgins won nine national titles and was given the Velma Springstead Trophy as the country's outstanding female athlete in 1937. In addition to three titles in javelin and ball throw, two in shot put, and one in discus, during national and abbreviated Canadian competition, Higgins also won the gold medal in the javelin event at the 1938 British Empire Games in Sydney, Australia. She was inducted into the Manitoba Sports Hall of Fame.

She died in Winnipeg on 31 December 1990 and posthumously inducted into the Canada's Sports Hall of Fame in 2015.

Footnotes

1915 births
1990 deaths
Canadian female javelin throwers
Canadian female shot putters
Athletes from Winnipeg
Commonwealth Games gold medallists for Canada
Athletes (track and field) at the 1938 British Empire Games
Commonwealth Games medallists in athletics
Manitoba Sports Hall of Fame inductees
20th-century Canadian women
Medallists at the 1938 British Empire Games